Makhnovets is a surname. Notable people with the surname include:

 Leonid Makhnovets (1919–1993), Ukrainian literary critic, historian, archaeologist, interpreter, and bibliographer
 Vladimir Makhnovets (1872–1921), Russian politician